David Loko is a former Papua New Guinean rugby league player who played for the Limoux Grizzlies in the Elite One Championship in France and for Papua New Guinea in international level. His position is second row. He played for the  Papua New Guinea national rugby league team in the 2010 Four Nations and was selected in the train-on side for the 2013 Rugby League World Cup. He first played with the Lorma Tarrangau in his local competition, the Ipatas Cup, then was selected to play with the Enga Mioks and went on to play for the Kumuls.

Personal life 
Loko works as a farmer in Papua New Guinea and as a fruit picker in Australia in 2018 while playing for the Fassifern Bombers in the Ipswich Regional Championship. He represented the kumuls at the Four Nations.

He played for the PNG Hunters in 2017 Instrust Super Cup final where they won for the first time.

References 

Papua New Guinean rugby league players
Enga Mioks players
Living people
Papua New Guinea national rugby league team players
Rugby league second-rows
Papua New Guinea Hunters players
Year of birth missing (living people)